Bruno Julius Wagner (12 October 1882 – 2 March 1952) was a German athlete and gymnast who competed for Germany and Switzerland in the Olympic Games.

In 1906 he competed for Germany at the Intercalated Olympic Games, winning a team gold medal in tug of war and participating in seven athletics events and three gymnastics events. Representing Switzerland, he competed in the men's hammer throw at the 1908 Summer Olympics and the men's pentathlon at the 1912 Summer Olympics.

References

External links
 

1882 births
1952 deaths
German male athletes
German male artistic gymnasts
Swiss male athletes
Swiss male hammer throwers
Olympic tug of war competitors of Germany
Olympic gold medalists for Germany
Olympic athletes of Germany
Olympic gymnasts of Germany
Olympic athletes of Switzerland
Medalists at the 1906 Intercalated Games
Tug of war competitors at the 1906 Intercalated Games
Athletes (track and field) at the 1906 Intercalated Games
Gymnasts at the 1906 Intercalated Games
Athletes (track and field) at the 1908 Summer Olympics
Athletes (track and field) at the 1912 Summer Olympics
People from Reutlingen
Sportspeople from Tübingen (region)